Acalolepta korolensis is a species of beetle in the family Cerambycidae. It was described by Masaki Matsushita in 1932. It is known from Malaysia.

References

Acalolepta
Beetles described in 1932